{{Automatic taxobox
| taxon = Mycerinopsis
| authority = Thomson, 1864
| synonyms = *Zotale Pascoe, 1866
| synonyms_ref = <ref name="gbif">{{GBIF |id=1126411 |taxon=Mycerinopsis' |accessdate=25 June 2021}}</ref>
}}Mycerinopsis is a genus of beetles in the family Cerambycidae, containing the following species:

subgenus Mycerinopsis
 Mycerinopsis flavosignata Breuning, 1973
 Mycerinopsis fulvescens Breuning, 1973
 Mycerinopsis lacteola (Hope, 1841)
 Mycerinopsis papuana Breuning, 1958
 Mycerinopsis spinipennis Breuning, 1939
 Mycerinopsis uniformis (Pascoe, 1863)

subgenus Zotale
 Mycerinopsis densepunctata Breuning, 1948
 Mycerinopsis excavata Breuning, 1948
 Mycerinopsis lineata (Gahan, 1895)
 Mycerinopsis subuniformis (Pic, 1926)
 Mycerinopsis tonkinea (Pic, 1926)
 Mycerinopsis unicolor (Pascoe, 1866)incertae sedis Mycerinopsis apomecynoides Hayashi, 1972
 Mycerinopsis roepstorffi'' Thomson, 1864

References

Apomecynini